Tepealan is a town in Korgan district of Ordu Province, Turkey. The population of Tepealan was 3,099 in 2011. In ancient ages, the area around Tepealan was quite populated because of the iron mines around. During the Ottoman Empire era, Turks as well as Greeks and Armenians lived in Tepealan. After the Russo-Turkish War (1877-1878), Moslem Georgian refugees were also settled in the village. In the 20th century, according to the Population exchange agreement between Turkey and Greece, the Christian population was replaced by a Moslem population from Greece. In 1974, Tepealan was declared  a seat of township.

References

External references
 Images

Populated places in Ordu Province
Towns in Turkey
Korgan District